The Voice van Vlaanderen (English-Dutch for The Voice of Flanders) is a Belgian reality singing competition for the Flemish part of Belgium. It is part of the franchise that started in the Netherlands as The Voice of Holland.  It kicked off on November 25, 2011 on VTM, shortly before the francophone Belgian variant The Voice Belgique went on air. As of 2022, the show has aired for eight seasons.

One of the important premises of the show is the quality of the singing talent. Four coaches, themselves popular performing artists, train the talents in their group and occasionally perform with them. Talents are selected in blind auditions, where the coaches cannot see, but only hear the auditioner.

The success of The Voice van Vlaanderen has led to the establishments of spin-off shows based on its concept, The Voice Kids and The Voice Senior.

Format 

The series consists of three phases: a blind audition, a battle phase, and live performance shows. Four judges/coaches, all noteworthy recording artists, choose teams of contestants through a blind audition process. Each judge has the length of the auditioner's performance (about one minute) to decide if he or she wants that singer on his or her team; if two or more judges want the same singer (as happens frequently), the singer has the final choice of coach.

Each team of singers is mentored and developed by its respective coach. In the second stage, called the battle phase, coaches have two of their team members battle against each other directly by singing the same song together, with the coach choosing which team member to advance from each of four individual "battles" into the first live round.  Within that first live round, the surviving four acts from each team again compete head-to-head, with public votes determining one of two acts from each team that will advance to the final eight, while the coach chooses which of the remaining three acts comprises the other performer remaining on the team.

In the final phase, the remaining contestants (Final 24) compete against each other in live broadcasts. The television audience and the coaches have equal say 50/50 in deciding who moves on to the final 4 phase. With one team member remaining for each coach, the (final 4) contestants compete against each other in the finale with the outcome decided solely by public vote.

Coaches

Notes

Coaches and finalists 
 – Winning coach and contestant. 
 – Runner-up coach and contestant.
 – 3rd place coach and contestant.
 – 4th place coach and contestant.
 –  5th place coach and contestant.

These are the coaches' teams starting from Live Shows. Winners are in bold and other finalists in italicized font.

Seasons summary

External links
The Voice van Vlaanderen Official website

 
2011 Belgian television series debuts
2012 Belgian television series endings
Flemish television shows
2010s Belgian television series
Belgian reality television series
VTM (TV channel) original programming